The Freeplay Independent Games Festival is Australia's longest-running and largest independent games festival, first established in 2004. The Festival celebrates fringe artists and game makers, and highlights grassroots developers and art games. It gathers artists, designers, programmers, writers, gamers, creators, games critics, games academics and students to celebrate the art form of independent games and the culture around them.

Freeplay is funded primarily through arts grants. Past and present sponsors include Australia Council for the Arts, Film Victoria, Victoria State Government, City of Melbourne, Australian Centre for the Moving Image (ACMI), and RMIT University.

With the aim of celebrating game making as arts practice, Freeplay has consistently aligned itself with the arts, and over the years has partnered with arts organisations such as Australian Centre for the Moving Image, State Library Victoria, Next Wave Festival, Wheeler Centre, Federation Square, Arts Centre Melbourne, National Gallery of Victoria, City of Melbourne, Arts House, National Young Writers' Festival, and more.

The current director of Freeplay is Chad Toprak (2017–). Previous directors have included Dan Golding (2014–2017), Katie Williams and Harry Lee Shang Lun (2013–2014), Paul Callaghan and Eve Penford-Dennis (2008–2012). The founding directors of Freeplay were Katherine Neil and Marcus Westbury.

History 
The Freeplay Independent Games Festival began in 2004 as Next Wave Festival's three-day-long Melbourne-based indie games conference 'Free Play', to celebrate independent game development and games culture. Since then, it has run in a variety of formats and venues across Melbourne.

In 2009, Freeplay hosted its first festival away from Next Wave, and rebranded itself from 'Free Play: The Next Wave Independent Game Developers Conference' into 'Freeplay Independent Games Festival'. Since 2009, Freeplay events have generally run annually.

In 2014, inspired by Venus Patrol's alternative E3 press conference Horizon, Freeplay introduced Parallels, a one-night event that serves as a counterpart to the main Freeplay festival. It takes place as part of Melbourne International Games Week, and highlights "unique, experimental, personal, and culturally significant games" made in the region. Parallels "is notable for providing the public first looks at games that would go on to be global gaming phenomena," including Untitled Goose Game, Necrobarista, Florence, Paperbark, Heavenly Bodies, the Frog Detective series, Unpacking, and Cult of the Lamb.

In 2015, Freeplay held, for the first time, both a multi-day Freeplay festival (10–19 April 2015) and a Parallels event (24 October 2015).

2020 and 2021 saw a virtual festival take place due to the COVID-19 pandemic. For the online Parallels showcases, Freeplay created an online pixel art version of the event's in-person venue, The Capitol, called The Zone, described by Kotaku as "a pixel-art version of an art gallery, except its for video games and you’re doing the whole thing through your browser."

In 2022, Parallels took place at RMIT, marking Freeplay's return to in-person events.

Freeplay Festival

Freeplay Parallels

Freeplay Awards

See also
 IndieCade
 Melbourne International Games Week
 Independent Games Festival

External links
 Official website

References

2004 establishments in Australia
Festivals established in 2004
Festivals in Melbourne
Free festivals
Indie video game festivals
Video game culture
Video gaming in Australia